The North Georgia Nighthawks (or UNG Nighthawks) are the athletic teams that represent the University of North Georgia (formed after the merger of North Georgia College & State University (NGCSU) and Gainesville State College in 2013), located in Dahlonega, Georgia, in intercollegiate sports at the Division II level of the National Collegiate Athletic Association (NCAA), primarily competing in the Peach Belt Conference since the 2005–06 academic year. North Georgia's rifle team competes at the Division I level as affiliate members of the Southern Conference (SoCon). 

North Georgia competes in thirteen intercollegiate varsity sports. Men's sports include baseball, basketball, golf, soccer, and tennis; women's sports include basketball, cross country, golf, soccer, softball, tennis, and track and field; and the rifle team is co-ed.

Overview
The merged school inherited the athletic legacy of NGCSU, which competed under the nickname "Saints" with a mascot of a Saint Bernard. Following the merger, 2013, the school's nickname was changed to the "Nighthawks," to help unify the merging schools.  Before joining the NCAA and the Peach Belt Conference, North Georgia competed in the National Association of Intercollegiate Athletics (NAIA) from 1970 to 2005.

Conference affiliations 
NAIA
Southern States Athletic Conference (1999–2005)

NCAA
 Peach Belt Conference (2005–present)

Varsity teams
UNG competes in 13 intercollegiate varsity sports: Men's sports include baseball, basketball, golf, soccer and tennis; while women's sports include basketball, cross country, golf, soccer, softball, tennis and track & field; and mixed sports include rifle.

Baseball 
UNG's baseball facility was constructed in 2008 for the former North Georgia College and State University. In 2010, it was dedicated to former NGC alumnus and baseball player Bob Stein, who donated much of the funds used in the construction of the field.[111] The UNG baseball team is a member of the Peach Belt Conference.  Coach Tom Cantrell is in his 20th season at the helm of the Nighthawks baseball program, having coached the team since it was relaunched in 2000.  Cantrell is assisted by Cody Clickner and Nick Palmer.

Softball 
The University of North Georgia softball team was founded in 1997. It is the only program at North Georgia to have won a National Championship in either the NAIA or the NCAA, winning the 2015 NCAA Division II Softball Championship in Oklahoma City. Coach Ricky Sanders launched the softball program, coaching for four seasons until 2000, which was also the year Sanders and the team won the title of Champions of the NAIA Regional Tournament. The softball team has competed as a member of the Peach Belt Conference since 2006 in NCAA Division II. Their other accomplishments include nine NCAA Tournament appearances, seven NCAA Super Regional appearances, and four NCAA Division II Championship appearances, including the school's first-ever National Championship in 2015. UNG has won six Peach Belt Conference titles in the past eight years, with back-to-back-to-back runs from 2009 to 2011 and 2014 to 2016. Mike Davenport has been the head coach of the program since 2001, with a winning percentage over .750 in that time. In the summer of 2015, after leading UNG to its first national championship, Davenport served as head coach of the National Pro Fastpitch league's USSSA Florida Pride, leading the Pride to the regular season NPF title and a runner-up finish in the Cowles Cup. He served as the last head coach of legendary pitcher Cat Osterman, who retired at the end of the 2015 season. Haines & Carolyn Hill Stadium, also known as "The Hill," was constructed during the fall of 2008 on UNG's Dahlonega campus. In 2014, Hill Stadium received a major upgrade with the installation of FieldTurf artificial playing surface in both the infield and outfield, allowing the team to practice regardless of the North Georgia climate which can feature heavy rains in the spring and occasional snow from late fall through early spring.

Men's basketball 

In 1971, the men's basketball team was established. Bill Ensley was the first person to coach this team. Since 2006, the team has competed in the Peach Belt Conference as an NCAA Division II member. Prior to being an NCAA Division II member, the team competed as an NAIA member in the Southern States Athletic Conference. Georgia, Alabama, and the Carolinas competed in this conference.

Women's basketball 
The University of North Georgia's women's basketball team (also known as the Nighthawks), created in 1971, was first coached by Linda Caruthers. The team competed as a NAIA member until 2005. It is currently in its 44th season competing in the Peach Belt Conference as an NCAA Division II member. The current coach, Buffie Berson, has been coaching the Women's Basketball team for the 22 seasons since 1994. The Nighthawks claimed the title of the Peach Belt Conference Regular Season Champions in 2006.

Women's cross country 

The University of North Georgia's women's cross country team has been competing for the college since 1996. Tom Williams, Amanda Harris, Jason Gibson, Chris Busby, and Gary Stiner founded and lead the team throughout this season, and the program has been active up until 2009. In 2010 and 2011, the women's cross country team did not compete, but it was reinstated for intercollegiate competition in 2012. Until the year 2006, North Georgia was an NAIA member of the Southern States Athletic Conference, otherwise known as the Georgia Alabama Carolina Conference. During the seasons of 2005–2007, the women's cross country team transitioned to the NCAA Division II. Since then, they have competed at the Peach Belt Conference, and they nationally appeared in the NCAA Division II in 2014.

Men's and women's tennis teams
Both the UNG men's and women's tennis teams are coached by Kent Norsworthy. He has been coaching both teams for eleven seasons (this is his 12th season) at UNG. In the end of the 2012 season the men's tennis team was ranked number 26th nationally in the NCAA Division Tournament II. In the 2016 season Norsworthy led both the women's and men's programs to their best seasons in modern history.

Rifle 
The UNG mixed rifle team is coached by head coach Tori Kostecki. The rifle team, the only UNG team that does not compete in the Peach Belt (due to the conference not sponsoring rifle), was previously a member of the Southeast Air Rifle Conference but became an associate member of the Division I Southern Conference in 2016–17. The team participated in the April 2014 USA Shooting Junior Olympic National Championship. The school's rifle facility is the Col. Raymond C. Hamilton Rifle Range and is part of the Military Leadership Center on the North Georgia Dahlonega campus.

Notable alumni

Men's basketball 
 Garland F. Pinholster
 Juan Ramón Rivas Castillo
 Montez Robinson

Women's basketball 
 Brenda Paul

Women's soccer 
 Jade Pennock

References

External links